Tropidophora articulata is a species of land snail with a gill and an operculum, a terrestrial gastropod mollusk in the family Pomatiidae.

This species is endemic to Mauritius.

References

articulata
Gastropods described in 1834
Taxa named by John Edward Gray
Endemic fauna of Mauritius
Taxonomy articles created by Polbot